Fish and Game may refer to:

 in the United States
Alabama Department of Conservation and Natural Resources, formerly the Department of Game and Fish
Alaska Department of Fish and Game
Arizona Game and Fish Department
Arkansas Game and Fish Commission
California Department of Fish and Wildlife, formerly the California Department of Fish and Game
Idaho Department of Fish and Game
Massachusetts Department of Fish and Game
Minnesota Fish and Game Division, now the Division of Fish and Wildlife
New Hampshire Fish and Game Department
New Mexico Game and Fish Department
North Dakota Game and Fish Department
Wyoming Game and Fish Department
 elsewhere:
Alberta Fish and Game Association
Fish and Game New Zealand